The 2015 European Ladies' Team Championship took place 7–11 July at Helsingør Golf Club in Helsingør, Denmark. It was the 32nd women's golf amateur European Ladies' Team Championship.

Venue 
The hosting club was founded in 1927 and the course, located 2 kilometres north-east of the city center of Helsingør, in the north-east corner of the island Zealand, Denmark, has been designed by Anders Amilion, John Harris and Anders Sørensen.

The club had previously hosted the 2007 Danish Ladies Masters on the Ladies European Tour.

The championship course was set up with par 71.

Format 
All participating teams played two qualification rounds of stroke-play with six players, counted the five best scores for each team.

The eight best teams formed flight A, in knock-out match-play over the next three days. The teams were seeded based on their positions after the stroke-play. The first placed team was drawn to play the quarter final against the eight placed team, the second against the seventh, the third against the sixth and the fourth against the fifth. In each match between two nation teams, two 18-hole foursome games and five 18-hole single games were played. Teams were allowed to switch players during the team matches, selecting other players in to the afternoon single games after the morning foursome games. Teams knocked out after the quarter finals played one foursome game and four single games in each of their remaining matches. Games all square after 18 holes were declared halved, if the team match was already decided.

The eight teams placed 9–16 formed flight B and the five teams placed 17–21 formed flight C, to play similar knock-out match-play, with one foursome game and four single games, to decide their final positions.

Teams 
A record number of 21 nation teams contested the event. Each team consisted of six players. Luxemburg took part for the first time.

Players in the leading teams

Other participating teams

Winners 
Eight times champions England lead  the opening 36-hole qualifying competition, with a score of even par 710, five strokes ahead of team Spain.

Individual leader in the 36-hole stroke-play competition was Puk Lyng Thomsen, Denmark, with a score of 6 under par 136, one stroke ahead of Matilda Castren, Finland and Alice Hewson, England.

Defending champions France won the championship, beating Switzerland 4–3 in the final and earned their eighth title. Switzerland played in their first final and reached the podium for the second time in a row, after finishing bronze medalist the previous year.

Team Spain earned third place, beating England 5–2 in the bronze match.

Results 
Qualification round

Team standings

* Note: In the event of a tie the order was determined by the better total non-counting scores.

Individual leaders

Note: There was no official award for the lowest individual score.

Flight A

Bracket

Final games

Flight B

Bracket

Flight C

Bracket

Final standings

Sources:

See also 
 Espirito Santo Trophy – biennial world amateur team golf championship for women organized by the International Golf Federation.
 European Amateur Team Championship – European amateur team golf championship for men organised by the European Golf Association.
 European Ladies Amateur Championship – European amateur individual golf championship for women organised by the European Golf Association.

References

External links 
 European Golf Association: Results

European Ladies' Team Championship
Golf tournaments in Denmark
European Ladies' Team Championship
European Ladies' Team Championship
European Ladies' Team Championship